Finance Credit was a Norwegian company that went bankrupt in 2002, after facing criminal investigation for siphoning funds (in total 1,4 billion NOK) it borrowed from six Norwegian banks to offshore tax havens, in what became known as the Finance Credit scandal, arguably the biggest economic fraud in Norwegian history. The company was founded by Torgeir Stensrud and Trond Kristoffersen, who were in 2005 convicted on charges of fraud to 7 and 9 years in prison, respectively. Stensrud and Kristoffersen were also both fined about 100 million €.

Trond Kristoffersen
Trond Kristoffersen (13 August 1956 – August 2013) was co-founder of the Finance Credit.

He was born in Hammerfest. In 2003, he was convicted of fraud and sentenced to 9 years in prison. He was also fined 1,2 billion NOK (ca. €100 million), and subsequently went personally bankrupt. He was also barred from engaging in any independent form of trade, as well as from holding senior or board positions in any companies, for life.  

He was incarcerated in Ullersmo prison from 2007, after the Supreme Court rejected his appeal, and was serving the rest of his 9-year prison sentence. After six years in jail he was released after lodging an appeal. He died in August 2013.

Torgeir Stensrud
Torgeir Stensrud (July 1, 1949 – September 27, 2015) was chairman of Finance Credit, a Norwegian former leader of Interallied Confederation of Reserve Officers, and military officer. He was sentenced to 7 years in prison for his role in the Finance Credit fraud scheme and 2002 bankruptcy.

External links
Juryens begrunnelse SKUP-pris og diplomer 2002(translation: The jury's reasoning for (awarding the) SKUP-award and diplomas)

References

Defunct companies of Norway
Companies disestablished in 2002
2002 in Norway